The 346th Missile Brigade was a Tactical ballistic missile brigade of the  Russian Ground Forces from 1992 to 1998. The brigade was first formed as the 21st Missile Brigade in 1961 and became the 346th Missile Brigade in 1992.  It was based at Oselki, part of the Leningrad Military District.

History 
The 21st Missile Brigade was formed in July 1961 at Oselki, part of the Leningrad Military District. It was composed of the 273rd and 505th Separate Missile Battalions, as well as a technical battery. The brigade was equipped with R-11 Zemlya (SS-1B Scud A) tactical ballistic missiles. In August 1963, the 273rd Separate Missile Battalion was transferred to the 23rd Rocket Brigade and was replaced by the newly activated 312th and 866th Separate Missile Battalions.  In December 1992, the brigade was redesignated as the 346th Missile Brigade. It also received newer OTR-21 Tochka tactical ballistic missiles. The brigade was disbanded in 1998.

References 

Theatre rocket brigades of Russia
Military units and formations disestablished in 1998
Military units and formations established in 1992